Milin Dokthian (IPA: [mí.lin dɔ̀ːk.tʰian]; born 11 November 1996), or nickname Namneung, is a former member of the Thai idol girl group BNK48, an international sister group of the Japanese idol girl group AKB48. She is one of the first generation members of the group, initially promoted to BNK48 Team BIII. She is now a member of BNK48 Team NV after team shuffle in 2020.

Namneung announced her graduation on November 13, 2022, on her birthday stage performance (BNK48 Team NV 1st Stage "Theater no Megami" Namneung's Birthday Stage).  Her graduation stage was on December 2, 2022. It was held as a group graduation stage, together with Noey, Orn, Tarwaan, Kaew, Mobile, and Pupe.

Biography  
Namneung has completed her undergraduate study at Thammasat University, majored in Environmental Science. Because of what she has studied, she appears several times in newspaper articles giving interview about her opinion on environmental problems.

In 2017, she participated in Fukuoka Asia Collection (FACo) along with Cherprang and Cancan.

In early 2018, she was selected as the representative for Thammasat University in the 72nd Chula-Thammasat Traditional Football Match.

BNK48 6th Single Senbatsu General Election 

Namneung submitted her application form on October 19, 2018 with her own video on her Instagram account.

The first preliminary results were announced on December 12, 2018. Namneung earned 6,893 votes, putting her in the 8th place. Unexpectedly, on January 12, 2019, the second preliminary results were announced in the middle of the BNK48 4th Single "Kimi wa Melody" Handshake Event and Namneung had fallen to the 13th place.

On January 26, 2019, the day of the final announcement, Namneung had earned 28,134 votes, making her one of the performing members of the 6th single with the 10th place.

BNK48 9th Single Senbatsu General Election 

Namneung submitted her application form on December 24, 2019.

The first preliminary results were announced on February 14, 2020. Namneung was on the 5th place with 7,317 votes. Later, on March 10, 2020, the second preliminary results were announced and she had fallen to the 9th place.

On April 19, 2020, the day of the final announcement, Namneung had earned 28,116 votes, making her one of the performing members of the 9th single with the 10th place. and she is a member whose rank remains unchanged compared to the previous General Election.

BNK48 12th Single Senbatsu General Election 

Namneung submitted her application form on December 24, 2019. Her desired position is the 1st place.

On March 11, 2022, the first preliminary results were announced and she was on the 2nd place with 10,544.14 tokens1 received. About two weeks later on March 24, 2022, her name was placed on he 4th place in the second preliminary results announcement.

Finally, the final results were announced on April 9, 2022. Namneung remained in the 4th place with 89,341.03 tokens. She is now one of the performing members of the 12th single and a member of "Kami 7".

1: Instead of the usual voting system, this year the company implemented the blockchain system to give transparency to the voting procedure. Voting count is in the unit of "Token", which refers to "BNK Token" used in the poll.

BNK48 Janken Tournament 2020 - Senbatsu of Destiny 
She also participated in the event, which took place on September 26, 2020. Her costume is a Likay costume with huge garlands made from banknotes with her own face printed on them. Although she has lost her first matchup against Nicha, a member of CGM48, she has been voted by other members to be one of the top three best costumes of the event (but in the end, Jennis won the award).

BNK48 Charaline 
Namneung is a part of the group's special unit "Charaline", together with Noey, Orn, Tarwaan, and Kaew. During a BNK48 Digital Live Studio livestream in late November 2021, the group announced that the unit will release a special project named "BNK48 Charaline Verb of Feeling", where each member of the unit performs a rearranged version of a BNK48 song. Her song is a reggae version of "High Tension", which was released on December 13, 2021. In addition to the project, they will also perform in their fan meeting event named "BNK48 Charaline 1st Fanmeet: Suphap Satri Chara Thepee Na Wang Weng Wi Wek Wi Weng Wong" on December 25-26, 2021. However, concerning the spread of the coronavirus in the country which was worsened in late 2021, the show was rescheduled to February 12-13, 2022 instead.

Brand ambassador 

In 2018, Buriram United announced that Namneung will be their sole brand ambassador in 2019, along with the celebration of their 10th year anniversary, thus making her the first brand ambassador of the soccer team in Thai League. Moreover, she has her own collaborated goods collection with Buriram United, named "Buriram United x Namneung BNK48" which has been on sale in the club's store since June 29, 2019. Buriram United has always been Namneung's favorite soccer team since several years ago and this is one of the reasons that the team had chosen her to be their first brand ambassador. In addition, she had once given an interview to FOX Spots Thailand in early 2018, and an official magazine from Changsuek (Thailand National Soccer Team) about her opinions on the club and the national soccer team.

Gallery

Works

Discography

BNK48 singles and albums 

Aside from the singles listed above, she is also one of the performing members of River, a song in the group's first album released in 2018. Furthermore, in the second album, Jabaja, she takes her part in two songs, Jabaja and Kami7 Go Green. Also, in 2020, she has participated in the song "Touch by Heart" in three different versions: Special Version (all BNK48 and CGM48 members), English Version, and Isaan Version. There is another song named "Can You...?" which is a collaboration between BNK48 and Grab, and she took a part in this song as well.

In June 2022, BNK48 also announced that Namneung, Pupe, Wee, Gygee, and Mobile will take part in the song "Mhok-Kob" (หมกกบ), which is an original soundtrack of the movie "Pha-Phee-Bok" (ผ้าผีบอก). The song and its music video was released on June 4, 2022.

Charaline and QUINNIES 
A special project named "BNK48 Charaline Verb of Feeling" was announced in late November 2021. The project features 5 rearranged songs performed by each member of Charaline unit (Namneung, Noey, Kaew, Orn, and Tarwaan). Namneung's song is High Tension, which was rearranged in reggae style. It was released altogether with its promotional video (PV) on December 13, 2021. These songs were also performed by Charaline members in "BNK48 Charaline 1st Fanmeet" on February 12-13, 2022.

One of the first subunits of BNK48 and CGM48 members under the newly-established "Independent Records (iR)" is "QUINNIES". It is an extended project from Charaline unit, hence five members from that unit belong to the group. During iR press conference on September 27, 2022, they also revealed that they are working on their first single which will be released in early 2023.

Filmography

Television shows

References

External links 

 Namneung's Profile on BNK48 official website

1996 births
Living people
Milin Dokthian
Milin Dokthian
Milin Dokthian
Milin Dokthian